Jacksonville International Airport  is a civil-military public airport 13 miles (21 km) north of Downtown Jacksonville, in Duval County, Florida. It is owned and operated by the Jacksonville Aviation Authority.

History
Construction started in 1965 on a new airport to handle travel to nearby naval bases. The new airport was dedicated on September 1, 1968, replacing Imeson Field. Terrain precluded lengthening the runways at Imeson, a necessity with the inception of commercial jet airliners. A new idea at JIA was separating departing and arriving passengers on different sides of the terminal (as can be seen in the photo on this page). This is no longer the case, and the airport (which has greatly expanded since the picture was taken) now uses the more typical layout with departing passengers on an upper level with an elevated roadway, and arriving passengers on the lower level.

The new airport was slow to expand, only serving two million passengers a year by 1982, but it served over five million annually by 1999 and an expansion plan was approved in 2000. The first phase, which included rebuilding the landside terminal, the central square and main concessions area, as well as consolidating the security checkpoints at one location, and more parking capacity was completed in 2004–2005. In 2007, 6,319,016 passengers were processed.

The second phase of the expansion program was carried out over three years, commencing in mid-2006 and projected to cost about $170 million. Concourses A and C were completely rebuilt; the former concourses have been demolished. Work on Concourse B was given a low priority because the capacities of the rebuilt Concourses A and C were more than adequate for existing demand. The expansion was designed by Reynolds, Smith & Hills (RS&H).

The economic downturn of 2009 caused a decrease in passengers and flights. This led the JAA to commence the demolition of Concourse B in June 2009 because it was safer and easier for the contractor. After the debris was removed, asphalt was laid to provide space for ground equipment parking. The concourse will be rebuilt when passenger traffic increases, which the JAA had originally projected would occur in 2013 but did not materialize. A section of the old concourse eventually became part of an airline club lounge which opened in 2019.

Expansion
In 2018, the airport handled 6,460,253 passengers, breaking the previous record set in 2007. 7,186,639 passengers were handled in 2019. This increase in traffic prompted the JAA to revive the plan to rebuild concourse B. The new concourse could open as early as 2022, providing six additional gates and could be expanded later with six more. The design of concourses A and C also allow them to be extended to accommodate additional gates. In 2019, RS&H and Jacobs Engineering were chosen to perform the design, while Balfour Beatty was selected as the construction manager for the concourse B project. However, due to the COVID-19 pandemic the terminal B expansion project was put on hold again. By 2022 traffic recovered to over 6.5 million passengers annually and the expansion project was restarted, with construction on concourse B expected to commence in summer 2023.

Operations

Facilities
The terminal at JIA is composed of a baggage claim area, on the first floor and a ticketing area on the second floor, at the front of the structure. Past baggage claim and ticketing is the mezzanine, where shops, restaurants and the security checkpoint are located. Beyond the mezzanine are the airport's Concourses A and C, which include 10 gates each (for a total of 20), along with other shops and restaurants.

The airport also has a Delta Sky Club on Concourse A and a multi-airline passenger club located behind the airside food court.

There are three galleries located off of the main courtyard before the security checkpoint. One features an art exhibit, the second houses a revolving exhibit about a Jacksonville-area landmark or institution, and the third houses a permanent exhibit highlighting the history of aviation in the region.

The airport's two runways form a "V" pattern (with the tip of the "V" pointing west). A plan exists to build two more runways, each paralleling one existing runway. The one alongside the existing southern runway will be built first. No date has been set.

In the fiscal year ending September 2016 the airport had 101,575 aircraft operations, an average of 278 per day: 58% scheduled commercial, 19% air taxi, 15% general aviation and 8% military. In August 2017, there were 54 aircraft based at this airport: 3 single-engine, 8 multi-engine, 25 jet and 18 military.

Military facilities

Concurrent with the closure of Imeson Airport, the 125th Fighter-Interceptor Group (125 FIG) of the Florida Air National Guard (FANG) relocated to Jacksonville International Airport. Military Construction (MILCON) funds provided for the establishment of Jacksonville Air National Guard Base in the southwest quadrant of the airport and placement of USAF-style emergency arresting gear on the JAX runways.  Upgraded from group to wing status and redesignated as the 125th Fighter Wing (125 FW) in the early 1990s, the wing is the host unit for Jacksonville ANGB and operates F-15C and F-15D Eagle aircraft.  The 125 FW is operationally-gained by the Air Combat Command (ACC).

Jacksonville ANGB is basically a small air force base, albeit without the military housing, military hospital or other infrastructure of major U.S. Air Force installations. The Air National Guard provides a fully equipped USAF Crash Fire Rescue station to augment the airport's own fire department for both on-airport structural fires and aircraft rescue and firefighting (ARFF) purposes. The base employs approximately 300 full-time military personnel (ART and AGR) and 1,000 part-time military personnel who are traditional air national guardsmen.

Airlines and destinations

Passenger

{
  "type": "FeatureCollection",
  "features": [
    {
      "type": "Feature",
      "properties": {
        "marker-symbol": "city",
        "text": "JAX",
        "marker-color": "0050d0",
        "marker-size": "large"
      },
      "geometry": {
        "type": "Point",
        "coordinates": [
          -81.6826629638672,
          30.49010107130931
        ]
      }
    },
    {
      "type": "Feature",
      "properties": {
        "marker-symbol": "airport",
        "text": "CVG"
      },
      "geometry": {
        "type": "Point",
        "coordinates": [
          -84.65841293334962,
          39.055750887618004
        ]
      }
    },
    {
      "type": "Feature",
      "properties": {
        "text": "IND",
        "marker-symbol": "airport"
      },
      "geometry": {
        "type": "Point",
        "coordinates": [
          -86.2981653213501,
          39.71454874459715
        ]
      }
    },
    {
      "type": "Feature",
      "properties": {
        "marker-symbol": "airport",
        "text": "PIT"
      },
      "geometry": {
        "type": "Point",
        "coordinates": [
          -80.2553415298462,
          40.496227552921354
        ]
      }
    },
    {
      "type": "Feature",
      "properties": {
        "text": "CLE",
        "marker-symbol": "airport"
      },
      "geometry": {
        "type": "Point",
        "coordinates": [
          -81.83810234069826,
          41.41103109073135
        ]
      }
    },
    {
      "type": "Feature",
      "properties": {
        "marker-symbol": "airport",
        "text": "LCK"
      },
      "geometry": {
        "type": "Point",
        "coordinates": [
          -82.93446063995363,
          39.817008053493815
        ]
      }
    },
    {
      "type": "Feature",
      "properties": {
        "marker-symbol": "airport",
        "text": "PHL"
      },
      "geometry": {
        "type": "Point",
        "coordinates": [
          -75.2402973175049,
          39.87644756906335
        ]
      }
    },
    {
      "type": "Feature",
      "properties": {
        "text": "EWR",
        "marker-symbol": "airport"
      },
      "geometry": {
        "type": "Point",
        "coordinates": [
          -74.17784214019777,
          40.690693687419774
        ]
      }
    },
    {
      "type": "Feature",
      "properties": {
        "marker-symbol": "airport",
        "text": "JFK"
      },
      "geometry": {
        "type": "Point",
        "coordinates": [
          -73.78276348114015,
          40.64629415394347
        ]
      }
    },
    {
      "type": "Feature",
      "properties": {
        "marker-symbol": "airport",
        "text": "LGA"
      },
      "geometry": {
        "type": "Point",
        "coordinates": [
          -73.87001037597658,
          40.7720918760227
        ]
      }
    },
    {
      "type": "Feature",
      "properties": {
        "marker-symbol": "airport",
        "text": "BOS"
      },
      "geometry": {
        "type": "Point",
        "coordinates": [
          -71.01832866668703,
          42.36542504355094
        ]
      }
    },
    {
      "type": "Feature",
      "properties": {
        "text": "BWI",
        "marker-symbol": "airport"
      },
      "geometry": {
        "type": "Point",
        "coordinates": [
          -76.6683053970337,
          39.17914601122213
        ]
      }
    },
    {
      "type": "Feature",
      "properties": {
        "marker-symbol": "airport",
        "text": "DCA"
      },
      "geometry": {
        "type": "Point",
        "coordinates": [
          -77.04349279403688,
          38.8534614587088
        ]
      }
    },
    {
      "type": "Feature",
      "properties": {
        "marker-symbol": "airport",
        "text": "TTN"
      },
      "geometry": {
        "type": "Point",
        "coordinates": [
          -74.81805324554445,
          40.276742703829406
        ]
      }
    },
    {
      "type": "Feature",
      "properties": {
        "marker-symbol": "airport",
        "text": "IAD"
      },
      "geometry": {
        "type": "Point",
        "coordinates": [
          -77.44756221771242,
          38.95313483975009
        ]
      }
    },
    {
      "type": "Feature",
      "properties": {
        "text": "ORF",
        "marker-symbol": "airport"
      },
      "geometry": {
        "type": "Point",
        "coordinates": [
          -76.20434761047365,
          36.89980274562748
        ]
      }
    },
    {
      "type": "Feature",
      "properties": {
        "marker-symbol": "airport",
        "text": "FLL"
      },
      "geometry": {
        "type": "Point",
        "coordinates": [
          -80.14517784118654,
          26.07166355018692
        ]
      }
    },
    {
      "type": "Feature",
      "properties": {
        "marker-symbol": "airport",
        "text": "MIA"
      },
      "geometry": {
        "type": "Point",
        "coordinates": [
          -80.27855873107912,
          25.794172690379042
        ]
      }
    },
    {
      "type": "Feature",
      "properties": {
        "marker-symbol": "airport",
        "text": "ATL"
      },
      "geometry": {
        "type": "Point",
        "coordinates": [
          -84.43194866180421,
          33.64074057128525
        ]
      }
    },
    {
      "type": "Feature",
      "properties": {
        "text": "TPA",
        "marker-symbol": "airport"
      },
      "geometry": {
        "type": "Point",
        "coordinates": [
          -82.53427505493165,
          27.982577844526148
        ]
      }
    },
    {
      "type": "Feature",
      "properties": {
        "text": "CLT",
        "marker-symbol": "airport"
      },
      "geometry": {
        "type": "Point",
        "coordinates": [
          -80.94391822814943,
          35.21981940793435
        ]
      }
    },
    {
      "type": "Feature",
      "properties": {
        "marker-symbol": "airport",
        "text": "GSP"
      },
      "geometry": {
        "type": "Point",
        "coordinates": [
          -82.21412658691408,
          34.89346406486655
        ]
      }
    },
    {
      "type": "Feature",
      "properties": {
        "marker-symbol": "airport",
        "text": "MSY"
      },
      "geometry": {
        "type": "Point",
        "coordinates": [
          -90.2579426765442,
          29.98342166752144
        ]
      }
    },
    {
      "type": "Feature",
      "properties": {
        "text": "BNA",
        "marker-symbol": "airport"
      },
      "geometry": {
        "type": "Point",
        "coordinates": [
          -86.66818141937257,
          36.13018016711117
        ]
      }
    },
    {
      "type": "Feature",
      "properties": {
        "marker-symbol": "airport",
        "text": "MDW"
      },
      "geometry": {
        "type": "Point",
        "coordinates": [
          -87.74116158485413,
          41.78835297129666
        ]
      }
    },
    {
      "type": "Feature",
      "properties": {
        "marker-symbol": "airport",
        "text": "ORD"
      },
      "geometry": {
        "type": "Point",
        "coordinates": [
          -87.90487289428712,
          41.97684819454686
        ]
      }
    },
    {
      "type": "Feature",
      "properties": {
        "marker-symbol": "airport",
        "text": "DTW"
      },
      "geometry": {
        "type": "Point",
        "coordinates": [
          -83.3576488494873,
          42.20734997191741
        ]
      }
    },
    {
      "type": "Feature",
      "properties": {
        "marker-symbol": "airport",
        "text": "MSP"
      },
      "geometry": {
        "type": "Point",
        "coordinates": [
          -93.21096897125246,
          44.883272480039786
        ]
      }
    },
    {
      "type": "Feature",
      "properties": {
        "text": "BLV",
        "marker-symbol": "airport"
      },
      "geometry": {
        "type": "Point",
        "coordinates": [
          -89.81653690338136,
          38.54809829615845
        ]
      }
    },
    {
      "type": "Feature",
      "properties": {
        "marker-symbol": "airport",
        "text": "STL"
      },
      "geometry": {
        "type": "Point",
        "coordinates": [
          -90.36469459533691,
          38.74015960587783
        ]
      }
    },
    {
      "type": "Feature",
      "properties": {
        "marker-symbol": "airport",
        "text": "AUS"
      },
      "geometry": {
        "type": "Point",
        "coordinates": [
          -97.66716957092287,
          30.202076589235993
        ]
      }
    },
    {
      "type": "Feature",
      "properties": {
        "text": "HOU",
        "marker-symbol": "airport"
      },
      "geometry": {
        "type": "Point",
        "coordinates": [
          -95.27669906616212,
          29.655164600486
        ]
      }
    },
    {
      "type": "Feature",
      "properties": {
        "text": "DFW",
        "marker-symbol": "airport"
      },
      "geometry": {
        "type": "Point",
        "coordinates": [
          -97.04026222229005,
          32.89738957850473
        ]
      }
    },
    {
      "type": "Feature",
      "properties": {
        "marker-symbol": "airport",
        "text": "DAL"
      },
      "geometry": {
        "type": "Point",
        "coordinates": [
          -96.85025453567505,
          32.843773329495235
        ]
      }
    },
    {
      "type": "Feature",
      "properties": {
        "marker-symbol": "airport",
        "text": "DEN"
      },
      "geometry": {
        "type": "Point",
        "coordinates": [
          -104.67361450195314,
          39.8517752151841
        ]
      }
    },
    {
      "type": "Feature",
      "properties": {"text": "LAX",
          "marker-symbol": "airport"
      },
      "geometry": {
        "type": "Point",
        "coordinates": [
          -118.40841293334962,
          33.94346675292802
        ]
      }
    }
  ]
}

Cargo

Statistics

Passenger traffic
The 2018 fiscal year set a record for passenger numbers at Jacksonville International Airport. Between September 2018 and August 2019, the airport handled 7,067,882 passengers, which was a 16.41% increase from the prior year.

Top destinations

Airline market share

Ground transportation

Jacksonville International Airport has direct public transit service to Jacksonville Transportation Authority's bus network. The Route 1 bus connects the airport to downtown Jacksonville, with connections to Greyhound Bus Lines and to the Jacksonville Skyway monorail system.

Accidents and incidents
On October 4, 1971, George M. Giffe Jr. hijacked a plane in Nashville, Tennessee, then forced the pilot to fly to Jacksonville, where Giffe killed his wife, the pilot and himself when cornered by the FBI.

On December 6, 1984, Provincetown-Boston Airlines Flight 1039 crashed on takeoff, killing 11 passengers and 2 crew on board. The debris from the Tampa-bound flight burned near Lem Turner Road. The 1986 National Transportation Safety Board report cited elevator trim control system failure, causing separation of the horizontal stabilizer.

See also
 Transportation in Jacksonville, Florida
 List of the busiest airports in the United States

References

External links
 Jacksonville International Airport page at the Jacksonville Aviation Authority website
  brochure from CFASPP
 Jacksonville International Airport in the 1960s-1970s,1980s, an extensive history of airline service at JAX
 Jacksonville International Airport Arts Commission, official site
 JIA ARFF Fire Department, unofficial site
 
 

Airports in Florida
Airports in Jacksonville, Florida
Airports in Duval County, Florida
1968 establishments in Florida
Northside, Jacksonville
Airports established in 1968